The Tevlin Women's Challenger is a professional tennis tournament played on indoor hardcourts. The event is classified as a $60,000 ITF Circuit tournament and has been held in Toronto, Canada since 2005.

Past finals

Singles

Doubles

External links
 Official website

 
ITF Women's World Tennis Tour
Tennis tournaments in Canada
Hard court tennis tournaments
Sport in Toronto
Tennis in Ontario
Recurring sporting events established in 2005
2005 establishments in Ontario